Bergerac Dordogne Périgord Airport  is an airport serving Bergerac, a commune of the Dordogne department (formerly the Périgord province) in the Nouvelle-Aquitaine region of France. It is also known as Bergerac-Roumanière Airport.

Facilities
It has one paved runway designated 10/28 which measures .

Airlines and destinations
The following airlines operate regular scheduled and charter flights at Bergerac Dordogne Périgord Airport:

Statistics

References

External links

 Official website
 
 

Airports in Nouvelle-Aquitaine
Buildings and structures in Dordogne